Aela Landscape Conservation Area is a nature park situated in Harju and Rapla County, Estonia.

Its area is 3662 ha.

The protected area was designated in 1981 to protect Aela-Viirika bog massives. In 2007, the protected area was redesigned to the landscape conservation area.

References

Nature reserves in Estonia
Geography of Harju County
Geography of Rapla County